Swann Oberson (born 26 July 1986, Geneva) is a Swiss open-water swimmer. In the 2008 Summer Olympics she finished sixth in the 10 km marathon swimming event. At the 2011 World Aquatics Championships she received gold in open water swimming – Women's 5 km. She competed for Switzerland at the 2012 Summer Olympics, again in the 10 km marathon, and finished in 18th place.

References

External links 
Official site of Swann Oberson

1986 births
Living people
Swiss female long-distance swimmers
Swimmers at the 2008 Summer Olympics
Swimmers at the 2012 Summer Olympics
Olympic swimmers of Switzerland
World Aquatics Championships medalists in open water swimming
Sportspeople from Geneva